State Route 44 (SR 44) is a state highway in the U.S. State of California that travels in an east–west direction from State Routes 273 and 299 in Redding to Lassen Volcanic National Park before ending at State Route 36 west of Susanville. This final portion, between the park and its terminus, is part of the Volcanic Legacy Scenic Byway, a National Scenic Byway.

Route description

Route 44 starts in Redding, at the junction of Route 273 (Market Street) and Route 299. This is because in 1998, Route 299's definition was changed. It previously ran on Tehama Street to I-5, but this portion was transferred to Route 44 in 1998 (SR 44 had ended at I-5 at that time). Existing postmile markers do not normally change, so the Route 44/I-5 interchange is still marked as 0.00, and instead the western extension of Route 44 to Route 299 has postmiles with an "L" prefix to signify an overlap due to a correction or change.

After running through one-way pairs through Downtown Redding, SR 44 departs SR 273 onto Tehama Street. After a few blocks, it becomes a freeway as it crosses I-5 and changes back to a two-lane highway at the Redding city limits. Heading eastward, Route 44 passes through a number of small, rural communities (Palo Cedro, Millville, Shingletown, to name a few) before it reaches the north-west entrance to Lassen National Park and the southern Cascades.  After this, the only community it passes through is Old Station, which is also the only location for travel services until Susanville.

From the Park entrance, Route 44 joins the Volcanic Legacy Scenic Byway. Route 44 is part of a circular portion of the Scenic Byway, so at the junction with Route 89, the Byway continues along both 89 to the north and on 44 to the east. When Route 44 reaches its terminus at Route 36, the byway heads southwest to continue its circular path.

Between the Route 89 intersection and Route 36 is only one rest area, called Bogard.

SR 44 is part of the California Freeway and Expressway System, and is part of the National Highway System, a network of highways that are considered essential to the country's economy, defense, and mobility by the Federal Highway Administration. SR 44 is eligible to be included in the State Scenic Highway System, but it is not officially designated as a scenic highway by the California Department of Transportation.

Major intersections

See also

Notes
1.Assuming Route 44 ends at SR 299, rather than at SR 273

References

External links

Caltrans: Route 44 highway conditions
California Highways: SR 44

044
044
State Route 044
State Route 044
Redding, California